Ana Violeta Navarro-Cárdenas (née Navarro Flores; born December 28, 1971) is a Nicaraguan-American political strategist and commentator. She appears on various television programs and news outlets, including CNN, CNN en Español, ABC News, and Telemundo. She is also a co-host of the daytime talk show The View, garnering Emmy Award nominations for her work. She is a member of the Republican Party.

Early life and education
Navarro was born in 1971 to a wealthy land-owning family in Nicaragua. She is the daughter of Violeta Flores López and José Augusto Navarro Flores. She and her family moved to the United States in 1980 because of political turmoil, though her father stayed behind to continue to fight with the Contras against the Sandinista government. She later said that then-U.S. President Ronald Reagan's support of the Contras made her a lifelong Republican.

Navarro attended the Carrollton School of the Sacred Heart, a private Catholic college preparatory day school for girls in Coconut Grove, Miami. Navarro earned a Bachelor's degree in Latin American Studies and Political Science in 1993 from the University of Miami. In 1997, she earned her Juris Doctor from St. Thomas University School of Law.

During her first year in university, Navarro campaigned for aid to the Contras. As a law student, Navarro successfully fought to keep Nicaraguan refugees from being deported during the mid-nineties.

Career
Navarro has served in a number of Republican administrations, including the transition team for Florida Governor Jeb Bush in 1998, as well as his Director of Immigration Policy. She also served as ambassador to the United Nations Commission on Human Rights, where she condemned human rights violations in Cuba. She later served as the National Co-Chair of the Hispanic Advisory Council for John McCain in 2008 and Jon Huntsman Jr. in 2012.

In February 2014, she became a political commentator for ABC News. In addition, she is also a political commentator on CNN and CNN en Español. Navarro became a contributor on the ABC daytime talk show The View from July 2013 to August 2018. She joined the series as a weekly guest co-host on November 2, 2018 and was named a permanent co-host of The View on August 4, 2022. She received Daytime Emmy Award nominations for Outstanding Informative Talk Show Host in 2020 and 2022.

Political positions
Navarro has described herself as a centrist.

In February 2013, Navarro publicly supported the legalization of same-sex marriage in an amicus curiae brief submitted to the U.S. Supreme Court.

Navarro supported Jeb Bush's 2016 presidential campaign. In October 2016, she made headlines when she strongly criticized Republican presidential nominee Donald Trump on CNN after the Donald Trump and Billy Bush recording surfaced, and called for party leaders to disown Trump. She also harshly criticized Trump's comments about immigrants, labeling him a racist. Navarro has been labeled a "Never Trumper." She voted for Democratic presidential candidate Hillary Clinton, stating that she decided to do so after seeing how close the race in Florida had become.

Navarro was a vocal opponent of Roy Moore in the 2017 Alabama Senate election, due to the allegations of sexual assault and molestation against him. In the 2018 Florida gubernatorial election, Navarro voted for Democrat Andrew Gillum over Republican Ron DeSantis because of DeSantis' ties to Trump. On August 11, 2020, she stated that she would be voting for Democratic presidential candidate Joe Biden in the 2020 United States presidential election. She and George Lopez hosted an online concert fundraiser for Biden on October 25, 2020.

After the Supreme Court overturned Roe v. Wade - which had legalized abortion nationwide - she spoke out in support of abortion rights, citing family members who have difficulty caring for relatives with physical and developmental disabilities.

Personal life
Navarro resides in Miami. She married lawyer and lobbyist Al Cárdenas on March 2, 2019.

References

Further reading
Navarro on Trump win: One nightmare over, another begins
Panelist: Give Donald Trump 'his medication'
Navarro to Trump: Stop acting like a mean girl
Ana Navarro: Republicans need to grow a spine

External links

 
 

1971 births
ABC News personalities
American political commentators
Centrism in the United States
CNN people
Florida Republicans
Living people
Nicaraguan emigrants to the United States
People from Chinandega
People from Miami
St. Thomas University (Florida) alumni
Television personalities from Florida
University of Miami alumni